Alexey Alexeevich Belan (born June 27, 1987) is a Latvian and Russian hacker on the FBI's list of most wanted criminals.
He has been accused of illegal access to the computer networks of three US companies in the states of Nevada and California. As a result of breaches committed in 2012 and 2013, a hacker stole personal data of company employees and several million registered users of their services, which was later sold through the Internet.
He is known under the pseudonyms Abyr Valgov, Abyrvalg, Fedyunya, Magg, М4G, and Moy.Yavik.

References

External links
Charges Announced in Massive Cyber Intrusion Case - Two of the Perpetrators Believed to be Russian Intelligence Officers (FBI)

Living people
Latvian computer scientists
Latvian people of Russian descent
1987 births